Urdu Globally (Urdu: اردو گلوبلی) is a Pakistani news website and digital media platform launched in April, 2017. The website aims to stream news and headlines, stories and hot topics 24/7 in Urdu. According to Alexa, Urdu Globally is ranked as #12,833 in Pakistan.

Urdu Writers Club 
Urdu Globally is reviving the traditional way of writing Urdu columns in a digital blogs. Urdu Globally gives opportunity for young writers to explore their passion in writing at their platform.

References

External links 
The Asia Today
Baghi TV
Urdu Point
Urdu Globally Twitter
Muckrack
BusinessList Pakistan
List of Newspaper in Pakistan

Web portals
Urdu-language websites
Pakistani websites